This is a list of British motorcycle speedway teams that no longer operate.

References

Defunct British speedway teams